Kannheiser Glacier is a glacier about  long, lying  east-southeast of Cape Flying Fish on Thurston Island, Antarctica, and flowing south into the Abbot Ice Shelf. It was first delineated from air photos taken by U.S. Navy Operation Highjump in December 1946, and was named by the Advisory Committee on Antarctic Names for Lieutenant Commander William Kannheiser, U.S. Navy, a helicopter pilot aboard , who explored and photographed new Thurston Island features in February 1960.

See also
 List of glaciers in the Antarctic
 Glaciology

Maps
 Thurston Island – Jones Mountains. 1:500000 Antarctica Sketch Map. US Geological Survey, 1967.
 Antarctic Digital Database (ADD). Scale 1:250000 topographic map of Antarctica. Scientific Committee on Antarctic Research (SCAR). Since 1993, regularly upgraded and updated.

References

 

Glaciers of Thurston Island